Gianluca Grava (born 7 March 1977) is an Italian retired football defender who currently works as Technical Director of the youth sector for Serie A club Napoli.

Career
He made his Serie A debut at the age of 30 in Napoli's 5–0 victory over Udinese on 2 September 2007; he had previously made over 350 appearances with various clubs in the lower divisions of Italian football.

On 1 July 2011 he extended his contract again.

Honours
Napoli
Coppa Italia: 2011–12

References

1977 births
Living people
Italian footballers
Casertana F.C. players
S.S. Turris Calcio players
Ternana Calcio players
U.S. Catanzaro 1929 players
S.S.C. Napoli players
Serie A players
Serie B players
Association football defenders